Ripoll is the capital of the comarca of Ripollès, in the province of Girona, Catalonia, Spain. It is located on confluence of the Ter River and its tributary Freser, next to the Pyrenees near the French border. The population was 11,057 in 2009.

The first traces of humans inhabiting the area date from the Bronze Age and can be seen in form of dolmens such as those found in El Sot de Dones Mortes or in Pardinella. This area was later used by peoples from the Atlantic culture to store bronze weapons and as a passway from the Catalan Central Depression to the Pyrenees. The area also has tombs from the late Roman occupation age and some belonging to the Visigoths.

It has a famous Benedictine monastery built in the Romanesque style, Santa Maria de Ripoll, founded by the count Wilfred the Hairy  in 879. The count used it as a centre to repopulate the region after conquering it. In the High Middle Ages, its castle, the Castle of Saguardia, located in the county of Les Llosses was ruled by the Saguàrdia family, of which Ponç de la Guàrdia was a famous troubadour.

An abundance of coal and iron ore, coupled with the ample water supply of the rivers Ter and Freser, encouraged a metal-working industry in the early Middle Ages. The furnaces of Ripoll were a prime source of nails for the peninsula. Later, pole arms and crossbows, always in demand, were added to Ripoll's exports. Ripoll enjoyed a reputation throughout Europe for the production of firearms. That  success as a manufactory of firearms brought frequent trouble to the city. French invasions in 1794, 1809, 1812, and 1813 crippled the city industries. However, the final and utter destruction of Ripoll, resulting from mines and blasting, occurred in 1839 during the Carlist Wars. Due to the loss of records and archives, not much is known of Ripoll and its industry to this day.

See also
Ethnographic Museum of Ripoll

References

External links 
 
 Government data pages 
 Ripoll, the cradle of Catalonia 

Municipalities in Ripollès
Populated places in Ripollès